The Musical Mutual Protective Union (MMPU) was a New York union of musicians, formed in 1863, with a focus on payment made to musicians in theaters and at balls.

In 1885, the union was open to "all instrumental performers, who have been residents of the United States for the period of six months previous to application." Foreign musicians were not allowed to play in orchestras unless they were in a union.

The union become Local 301 of the American Federation of Musicians in 1902.  In 1904, it had 5,000 members, who were almost entirely German. In 1910, approximately 300 black musicians were members in the roughly 8,000-member union.

It was located at 209 East 85th Street in Manhattan, New York City, between Second Avenue and Third Avenue, in a building constructed in 1919. The building was later a theater and hall, a casino, and a waiters' union.  The basement of the building now houses the Amsterdam Billiard Club.  The original facade on 85th Street is still extant.

The union lost its charter in 1921.  In 1929 the union planned a mass march against joblessness, claiming 35,000 unemployed, but was unable to secure a parade permit from the police.

References

External links
 Constitution and By-laws of the Musical Mutual Protective Union: Local 310, A. F. of M. Founded April 23, 1863; Organized and Adopted June 26, 1864. Amended and Revised, Musical Mutual Protective Union, Machauer & Schmetterling (1905)

American Federation of Musicians
Music organizations based in the United States
Trade unions established in 1863